David McLaren (1872 – 3 November 1939) was a Mayor of Wellington and Member of Parliament in New Zealand.

Early years
Born in Glasgow, Scotland and an operative in the boot trade. He enjoyed the poetry of Robert Burns and was member of the Burns Club.

On arriving in Wellington McLaren became involved in the Union movement seeking to improve the lot of lower paid workers.  McLaren was Secretary of the Wellington Wharf Labourers Union in New Zealand. He was considered a moderate socialist.

He was a member of the Wellington City Council for 11 years from 1901 to 1912 and was elected Mayor of Wellington from 1912 to 1913. McLaren was also member of the Hospital Board for 12 years. During World War I McLaren was appointed to the Military Service Board, and also served on the War Relief Association from its inception in 1914. At the end of the war he was appointed to the Influenza Epidemic Commission.

Member of Parliament

Two Liberal candidates received similar votes and both were eliminated in the first ballot. This left McLaren face a conservative candidate, Arthur Atkinson, in the second ballot, and with many liberal voters transferring their allegiance to McLaren, he became the only candidate of the IPLL who was ever elected to the House of Representatives. McLaren attended the Liberal Party's caucus, but maintained his independence in the house, voting both with and against them.

In 1911 he was defeated by the conservative candidate, Alfred Newman, by 65 votes. At the 1914 contest, McLaren was again unsuccessful, this time by 48 votes.

McLaren became estranged from the Labour Party during World War I. He was concerned about the rise of militant elements within the party. Later on, McLaren organised the wartime Welfare League and through this was associated with Edward Kellett.

He died on 3 November 1939 at Wellington Public Hospital. He was survived by his wife and daughter who were living in London.

Notes

References

No Mean City by Stuart Perry (1969, Wellington City Council) includes a paragraph and a portrait or photo for each mayor

|-

1872 births
1939 deaths
Mayors of Wellington
New Zealand trade unionists
Scottish emigrants to New Zealand
Politicians from Glasgow
Independent Political Labour League MPs
New Zealand Labour Party (1910) MPs
United Labour Party (New Zealand) politicians
Unsuccessful candidates in the 1902 New Zealand general election
Unsuccessful candidates in the 1911 New Zealand general election
Unsuccessful candidates in the 1914 New Zealand general election
Unsuccessful candidates in the 1905 New Zealand general election
Members of the New Zealand House of Representatives
New Zealand MPs for Wellington electorates
Wellington City Councillors
Wellington Hospital Board members